"Fiesta" is a Greek Pop song by Helena Paparizou. The song was exclusively released on Dromos FM 89,8 (Athens), Cosmoradio 95,1 (Thessaloniki) on June 27, and was officially released on July 4 on Vevo. It is the third single from her sixth Greek studio album Ouranio Toxo which released in December 15, 2017.

The song is written by Michael Tsaousopoulos, Teo Tzimas and Dimitris Beris.
The English version released on July 15 on her vevo channel. Lyrics are written by Nektarios Tyrakis.
Paparizou performed "Fiesta" for the first time at the annual MAD Video Music Awards held in Tae Kwon Do Stadium in Athens on the 28th June 2016. On July 1, Paparizou performed "Fiesta" at the semi-finals of The X Factor (Greek series 4).

Charts

Release history

Greek Version

English Version

References

2016 singles
Helena Paparizou songs
2016 songs
Number-one singles in Greece
Greek-language songs